Eden Park is the main sports ground in Auckland, New Zealand.

Eden Park may also refer to:

 Eden Park, London, a suburb in the London Borough of Bromley, England
 Eden Park railway station
 Eden Park (Cincinnati), a public park in Cincinnati, Ohio 
 Eden Park, West Virginia
 Eden Park, Victoria, a rural locality north of Melbourne, Australia 
 Eden Park, Colorado, historical name for Indian Hills, Colorado
 Eden Park, historic building in Marryatville, South Australia, now part of Marryatville High School